Robert Saba (born 2 January 1975) is a former Ghanaian professional footballer who played as a midfielder for Accra Hearts of Oak for most of his career. He also played for the Ghana national football team.

Club career 
Saba started his career with Advanced Stars before joining Voradep Ho where he won the Ghanaian FA Cup in his first season in 1991–92. He joined Accra Hearts of Oak in 1992–93 season later winning the Ghanaian FA Cup in 1993–94. He joined Al Hilal SFC and won the Saudi Premier League in 1995–96, his only season with the club.

Saba returned to Accra Hearts of Oak in 1996. He further went on to win the Ghana Premier League in five consecutive seasons from 1996–97 to 2001 and winning the Ghanaian FA Cup in 1999 and 2000. He moved to Haras El Hodoud SC in the Egyptian Premier League where he spent two seasons from 2002 to 2004.

International career 
Saba played for all national team ranks for Ghana from U-17, U-20, U-23 to the senior national team. Saba featured for Ghana national football team twice between 1993 and 1995. He known for being one of the few Ghanaian footballers to have played for all Ghana's national teams. He played a total 39 matches for all national teams, featuring 18 times for the senior side, the Black Stars.

Personal life 
Saba is the brother of fellow Ghanaian international Christian Saba who played for Bayern Munich II for most of his career. The duo lost their father Daniel Saba in 2017.

Honours

Club 
Voradep Ho

 Ghanaian FA Cup: 1991–92

Hearts of Oak

 Ghana Premier League: 1996–97, 1997–98, 1999, 2000, 2001
 Ghanaian FA Cup: 1993–94, 1999, 2000
Ghana Super Cup: 1997, 1998
CAF Champions League: 2000
CAF Super Cup: 2001

Al Hilal

 Saudi Premier League: 1995–96

References

External links 

Living people
1975 births
Association football midfielders
Ghanaian footballers
Ghana international footballers
Ghanaian expatriate footballers
Accra Hearts of Oak S.C. players
Ghana Premier League players
Ghana under-20 international footballers
Ghana youth international footballers
Al Hilal SFC players
Saudi Professional League players
Haras El Hodoud SC players
Expatriate footballers in Saudi Arabia
Expatriate footballers in Egypt
Ghanaian expatriate sportspeople in Saudi Arabia
Ghanaian expatriate sportspeople in Egypt
Egyptian Premier League players
People from Accra
Ga-Adangbe people